Victoria Flynn (born July 14, 1972) is an American lawyer and Republican politician who has represented the 13th Legislative District in the New Jersey General Assembly since taking office on January 11, 2022.

Political career
In 2016, Flynn was elected to the board of education of the Holmdel Township Public Schools and in 2018 became president of the board, having previously served on the board of education of the Nutley Public Schools.

Flynn ran in the primary for New Jersey's 13th legislative district against incumbent Republican Serena DiMaso. She won the November 2, 2021, general election alongside Republican Gerard Scharfenberger, defeating Democratic candidates Allison Friedman and Erin Howard.

Flynn was one of a record seven new Republican Assemblywomen elected in the 2022 general election, joining seven Republican women incumbents who won re-election that year.

Committees 
Committee assignments for the current session are:
Financial Institutions and Insurance
Housing
Judiciary
Joint Committee on the Public Schools

District 13
Each of the 40 districts in the New Jersey Legislature has one representative in the New Jersey Senate and two members in the New Jersey General Assembly. The representatives from the 13th District for the 2022—23 Legislative Session are:
Senator Declan O'Scanlon (R)
Assemblywoman Vicky Flynn (R)
Assemblyman Gerard Scharfenberger (R)

References

External links
Legislative webpage

21st-century American politicians
Living people
Republican Party members of the New Jersey General Assembly
People from Holmdel Township, New Jersey
People from Nutley, New Jersey
Politicians from Monmouth County, New Jersey
School board members in New Jersey
1972 births